Wildair (foaled 1917 in Kentucky) was an American Thoroughbred racehorse bred and raced by Exemplar of Racing Harry Payne Whitney and trained by U.S. Racing Hall of Fame inductee, James Rowe Sr. Wildair's most important race win came in the 1920 Metropolitan Handicap, one of the most prestigious American races outside of the Triple Crown series.

Breeding
Regally bred, Wildair was sired by Hall of Fame inductee Broomstick who was the son of another Hall of Fame inductee, Ben Brush. Wildair's dam was Verdure by yet another Hall of Fame inductee Peter Pan.

Racing career
In his three-year-old season, after running third to the legendary Man o' War in the Preakness Stakes, Wildair won the 1920 Empire City Derby. Among his other notable wins in 1920, Wildair won the Chesapeake Handicap at Pimlico Race Course and defeated the 1919 U.S. Triple Crown champion Sir Barton to win the Marathon Handicap at Havre de Grace Racetrack. Racing at age four, Wildair won the Delaware Handicap.

Progeny
Wildair was modestly successful as a sire. His best was the colt Sir Harry who won the 1927 Coffroth Handicap, the then richest race in North America with a purse of $100,000. That same year Sir Harry ran second to Bostonian in the 1927 Preakness Stakes. Wildair was also the damsire of several very good horses including Pot O'Luck and U.S. Racing Hall of Fame inductees Alsab and Bewitch.

Pedigree

References

1917 racehorse births
Thoroughbred family 19-b
Racehorses bred in Kentucky
Racehorses trained in the United States